Kroger Field, also known as Commonwealth Stadium, is a stadium in Lexington, Kentucky, United States, located on the campus of the University of Kentucky that primarily serves as the home field for the Kentucky Wildcats football team. The stadium is located at the corner of Alumni Drive and University Drive in Lexington.  The playing surface is named C.M. Newton Grounds in honor of retired UK athletic director and former baseball and basketball player C.M. Newton. Built in 1973, it is the newest football stadium in the Southeastern Conference, as measured by date of original construction. The original capacity for the stadium was 57,800. In the stadium's first game, played on September 15, 1973, the Wildcats defeated the Virginia Tech Hokies 31–26.

History

Renovations
Both ends of the stadium were enclosed in 1999 and 40 suites were added, 10 in each corner of the stadium, resulting in a symmetrical oval bowl seating 67,530. The total cost of the expansion was $27.6 million. Seating adjustments over the next decade brought capacity to 67,942.  During the 1999 season, Kentucky's average home attendance for football games was 67,756. Attendance for the game against Tennessee that year was 71,022, which remained the record attendance until the Wildcats' 2007 game against Florida drew 71,024. For much of the next decade, Wildcat football games frequently attracted crowds in excess of 70,000.

The University of Kentucky announced an audio and video upgrade to the stadium in July 2011. Combined, the  make the new video boards one of the largest scoreboard systems in the country. Additionally, a new custom audio system and over 1,800 linear sq/ft of video ribbon board were implemented by September 10, 2011. The approximate cost of the upgrades totaled close to $6 million.

The stadium underwent a $110 million renovation in 2015. The renovation included a new press box, loge box seats, club seats, recruiting room, suites, concourses, bathrooms, lights, and exterior facade while reducing capacity to around 61,000. The project was completed before the start of the 2015 season. It was referred to as "The New Commonwealth Stadium". On May 1, 2017, the university, along with marketing partner JMI Sports, announced the stadium's name change to Kroger Field, part of a 12-year, $1.85 million per year naming rights deal with Cincinnati-based retailer Kroger. This agreement makes the University of Kentucky the first school in the Southeastern Conference to enter into a corporate partnership for the naming rights to their football stadium.

KHSAA Football Championship 
Since 2017, Kroger Field has been the site for Kentucky's high school football championship games. The event was moved from Western Kentucky University's Houchens Industries–L. T. Smith Stadium due to conflicts with WKU's hosting of two recent Conference USA championship games (2015 and 2016), which led to rescheduling of high school title games on short notice. The 2017 championships were the first held in Lexington since 1976.

Since 1999, fireworks have been shot from atop the suites whenever the Wildcats take the field, as well as after every Wildcat score and win.

Concerts
The stadium hosted no concerts in its first 47 years of use. The first concert was scheduled for 2020. Due to the COVID-19 pandemic, the concert was rescheduled and took place on April 24, 2022. The concert featured Chris Stapleton, Willie Nelson, and Sheryl Crow.

See also
Bluegrass Miracle
2003 Arkansas vs. Kentucky football game, a game at Commonwealth that took seven overtime periods to decide
Stoll Field/McLean Stadium
List of NCAA Division I FBS football stadiums

References

External links

 

College football venues
Buildings at the University of Kentucky
Kentucky Wildcats football venues
Sports venues in Lexington, Kentucky
American football venues in Kentucky
1973 establishments in Kentucky
Sports venues completed in 1973
Kroger